The Sport of Kings is a 1924 comedy play by the British writer Ian Hay.It ran for 319 performance at the Savoy Theatre in the West End between 8 September 1924 and 13 June 1925.

Adaptation
In 1931 it was adapted into a film The Sport of Kings by Gainsborough Pictures. It was directed by  Victor Saville and starred Leslie Henson and Gordon Harker.

References

Bibliography
 Goble, Alan. The Complete Index to Literary Sources in Film. Walter de Gruyter, 1999.
 Wearing, J. P. The London Stage 1920-1929: A Calendar of Productions, Performers, and Personnel. Rowman & Littlefield, 2014.

1924 plays
Plays by Ian Hay
British plays adapted into films
West End plays
Comedy plays